McCalebb is a surname. Notable people with the surname include:

Bo McCalebb (born 1985), American-Macedonian basketball player
Howard McCalebb (born 1947), American sculptor
Onterio McCalebb (born 1989), American footballer

See also
McCaleb